Rembrandt Gardens is a neighborhood within the city limits of Tampa, Florida. As of the 2000 census the neighborhood had a population of 134. The ZIP Code serving the area 33616.

Geography
Rembrandt Gardens boundaries are Lois Avenue to the east, Manhattan Avenue to the west, Interbay Boulevard to the south, and Rembrandt Drive to the north.

Demographics
Source: Hillsborough County Atlas

At the 2010 census there were 370 people living in the neighborhood. The population density was 1,196/mi2. The racial makeup of the neighborhood was 44% White, 25% African American, 1% Native American, 6% Asian, 14% from other races, and 9% from two or more races. Hispanic or Latino of any race were about 38%.

Of the 56 households 38% had children under the age of 18 living with them, 30% were married couples living together, 22% had a female householder with no husband present, and 9% non-families. 35% of households were made up of individuals.

The age distribution was 32% under the age of 18, 27% from 18 to 34, 26% from 35 to 49, 13% from 50 to 64, and 6% 65 or older. For every 100 females, there were 90 males.

The per capita income for the neighborhood was $10,712. About 29% of the population were below the poverty line. Of those, 44% are under the age of 18.

See also
Neighborhoods in Tampa, Florida

References

External links
 Rembrandt Gardens Neighborhood Page

Neighborhoods in Tampa, Florida
Public housing in the United States